Novomukhametovo (Yañı Möxämät) is a rural locality (a village) in Ibrayevsky Selsoviet, Kiginsky District, Bashkortostan, Russia. The population was 3 as of 2010.

Geography 
Novomukhametovo is located 25 km southwest of Verkhniye Kigi (the district's administrative centre) by road. Yukalikulevo is the nearest rural locality.

References 

Rural localities in Kiginsky District